"Reality" is a song recorded by James Brown. Released as a single in 1975, it charted #19 R&B and #80 Pop. It also appeared on an album of the same name.

References

James Brown songs
Songs written by James Brown
Songs written by Fred Wesley
1975 singles
1974 songs
Polydor Records singles